Per amore di Poppea (For the Love of Poppaea) is a 1977 Italian commedia sexy all'italiana directed by Mariano Laurenti and set in ancient Rome.

Plot

Cast 

María Baxa as Poppaea Sabina
Gianfranco D'Angelo as Tizio
Alvaro Vitali as Caio
Oreste Lionello as Nero  
Renato Chiantoni as Seneca
Toni Ucci as Tigellinus
Tiberio Murgia

See also    
 List of Italian films of 1977

References

External links

1977 films
Commedia sexy all'italiana
1970s sex comedy films
Films directed by Mariano Laurenti
Films set in ancient Rome
Films set in the Roman Empire
Depictions of Nero on film
Cultural depictions of Poppaea Sabina
Cultural depictions of Seneca the Younger
Films scored by Gianni Ferrio
1977 comedy films
1970s Italian films